Existence checking or existence detection is an important aspect of many computer programs. An existence check before reading a file can catch and/or prevent a fatal error, for instance. For that reason, most programming language libraries contain a means of checking whether a file exists.

An existence check can sometimes involve a "brute force" approach of checking all records for a given identifier, as in this Microsoft Excel Visual Basic for Applications code for detecting whether a worksheet exists:

Function SheetExists(sheetName As String) As Boolean

  Dim sheetCount As Integer
  Dim t As Integer

  SheetExists =  False
  sheetCount = ActiveWorkbook.Sheets.Count
  For t = 1 To  sheetCount
    If Sheets(t).Name = sheetName Then
      SheetExists = True
      Exit Function
    End If
  Next t
End Function

References

Computer programming